Pseudoparmelia is a genus of lichenized fungi in the family Parmeliaceae. The genus has a pantropical distribution, and contains 27 species. It was circumscribed by Bernt Arne Lynge in 1914, who distinguished the genus from Parmelia by the presence of pseudocyphellae on the underside of the lichen thallus.

Species
Pseudoparmelia arida (Lynge) Elix & T.H.Nash (1998)
Pseudoparmelia brakoana Elix & T.H.Nash (1998)
Pseudoparmelia buckiana Elix & T.H.Nash (1998)
Pseudoparmelia chapadensis (Lynge) Hale (1974)
Pseudoparmelia chlorea (Stizenb.) Krog & Swinscow (1987)
Pseudoparmelia concomitans Hale (1976)
Pseudoparmelia convexa Elix & T.H.Nash (1998)
Pseudoparmelia cubensis (Nyl.) Elix & T.H.Nash (1998)
Pseudoparmelia cyphellata Lynge (1914)
Pseudoparmelia dahlii Hale (1976)
Pseudoparmelia floridensis Elix & T.H.Nash (1998)
Pseudoparmelia harrisiana Elix & T.H.Nash (1998)
Pseudoparmelia hypomiltha (Fée) Hale (1974)
Pseudoparmelia kalbiana Elix & T.H.Nash (1998)
Pseudoparmelia regnellii (Lynge) Elix & T.H.Nash (1998)
Pseudoparmelia relicinoides Elix & T.H.Nash (1998)
Pseudoparmelia sphaerospora (Nyl.) Hale (1976)
Pseudoparmelia uleana (Müll. Arg.) Elix & T.H.Nash (1998)

References

Parmeliaceae
Lichen genera
Lecanorales genera
Taxa named by Bernt Arne Lynge